Traiectum was a Roman fort, on the frontier of the Roman Empire in Germania Inferior. The remains of the fort are in the center of Utrecht, Netherlands, which takes its name from the fort.

History

In the Roman Empire Traiectum was one of the forts in the lower Limes Germanicus defensive lines.
The Emperor Claudius defined the Rhine downstream from Bonn as the western part of the frontier.
He ordered the legions further north to withdraw to this line, which was fortified in AD 47.
The Rhine divides into several branches in the Netherlands. 
The army chose the branch on which modern Utrecht lies as the frontier.

In AD 69-70 Gaius Julius Civilis led the revolt of the Batavi during which the fort was burned.
One soldier or officer buried his savings of fifty gold coins at this time. They were found by archaeologists below the layer of burned wood. 
Once the Romans had restored their authority in the region they rebuilt the fort, again in wood. The fort was manned by about 500 troops.

The castellum of Traiectum seems to have been finally destroyed some time before 270, when the Franks invaded.
Archeological evidence shows some Roman presence into 4th century, but the castellum was not rebuilt.
During the Early Middle Ages another fortification was built on the site, which was destroyed by the Vikings and rebuilt in 818.
The site of the fortifications became the center of the medieval town and location of the episcopal see of Utrecht.

Layout

The fort was rebuilt four times, and each time was raised up by adding fill.
Periods I-II date from AD 47-69; periods III-IV date from 70 to the end of the 2nd century; and period V dates from the end of the 2nd century to the middle of the 3rd century. The fort was made of wood in periods I-IV,  in size, with ramparts made of earth and wood.
At this time the gates were flanked by stone gate towers with semi-circular bastions on the exterior.

The fort contained the headquarters building, or principia, within a rectangular courtyard surrounded by a colonnade (portico).
The building had hypocaust underfloor heating.
The central room was the shrine of the legions' standards, or sacellum. This room and the atrium both held stone altars in period V.
A protective ditch surrounded the fort throughout its Roman occupation.
There were vici to the east and west of the castellum where craftsmen lived who depended on the soldiers. 

Excavations

Several excavations have been undertaken, mostly between 1929 and 1949. 
The archaeologists were at first looking for the remains of two medieval churches that stood on the site, but changed their priority after the remains of the castellum were found.
Parts of walls were found later, as were partial remains of wooden barracks and traces of the moat.
Two of the fort's four gates have been excavated. 
Some parts of the barracks from different periods have been excavated. The main building, the principia, has been fully excavated.
Beginning in 1992, the nearby Duitse Huis, headquarters of the Teutonic Knights' Bailiwick of Utrecht from 1348, was extensively renovated.
This included building a new wing of the Grand Hotel Karel V. Traces of a Roman cemetery were found, perhaps associated with the fort.

Notes

References

Sources

Roman fortifications in Germania Inferior
Districts in Utrecht (city)
Roman legionary fortresses in Netherlands
Buildings and structures in Utrecht (city)